San Marcos District is one of sixteen districts of the Huari Province in Peru.

Geography 
Other mountains are listed below:

Ethnic groups 
The people in the district are mainly indigenous citizens of Quechua descent. Quechua is the language which the majority of the population (72.16%) learnt to speak in childhood, 27.31% of the residents started speaking using the Spanish language (2007 Peru Census).

References

Districts of the Huari Province
Districts of the Ancash Region